Hikmat Izzat oglu Mirzayev is an Azerbaijani military officer. He is a lieutenant general of the Azerbaijani Armed Forces and the commander of the Special Forces, and participated in the 2016 Nagorno–Karabakh clashes and the 2020 Nagorno-Karabakh war, during which he led Azerbaijani forces in the 2020 battle of Shusha. He had received the title of the Hero of the Patriotic War.

Life and service 
Mirzayev was born in the Bilasuvar District of the then Azerbaijani SSR within the Soviet Union. On 19 January 2002, by the decree of the President Heydar Aliyev, Mirzayev was awarded the rank of lieutenant colonel. On 29 April 2015, as the commander of the Special Forces, Major General Mirzayev, took part in the ceremony of presenting battle flags to the newly created military units of the Azerbaijani Special Forces. He led the Azerbaijani Special Forces during the April 2016 clashes in Nagorno–Karabakh.

On 4 October 2020, President Ilham Aliyev, in his position as Supreme Commander-in-Chief of the Armed Forces of Azerbaijan, congratulated Mirzayev, as well as Major General Mais Barkhudarov, and the personnel they led on the capture of the city of Jabrayil and nine villages of Jabrayil District. On 17 October, by  decree of President Aliyev, Mirzayev was awarded the rank of lieutenant general On 8 November, Aliyev congrulated him on capture of Shusha. On 10 December, Mirzayev led the servicemen of the Special Forces of the Ministry of Defense who marched in the Baku Victory Parade.

Awards 
 On 24 June 2003, Mirzayev was awarded the For Heroism Medal by the decree of President Heydar Aliyev No. 887 for "special merits in protecting the independence and territorial integrity of the Republic of Azerbaijan, for the distinction in the performance of his official duties and the tasks assigned to the military unit."
 On 24 June 2015, Mirzayev was awarded the For service to the Fatherland Order.
 On 17 October 2020, Mirzayev was awarded the military rank of lieutenant general by Ilham Aliyev.
 On 9 December 2020, Mirzayev was awarded the Hero of the Patriotic War Medal by the decree of the President Aliyev.

References 

People from Bilasuvar District
Azerbaijani generals
2016 Nagorno-Karabakh clashes
Year of birth missing (living people)
Living people
Heroes of the Patriotic War